Bolland is a surname. Notable people with the surname include:

Adrienne Bolland (1896–1975), French test pilot; first woman to fly over the Andes
Brian Bolland (born 1951), British comics artist
C. J. Bolland (born 1971), English electronic-music producer
Charlotte Bolland, British art historian and curator
David Bolland (born 1986), Canadian professional ice hockey player
Gerardus Johannes Petrus Josephus Bolland (1854–1922), Dutch philosopher, scholar, and linguist
Gordon Bolland (born 1943), English professional football player and manager
Janice Bolland (born 1966), American cyclist
Jasper Bolland (born 1986), Dutch professional football player
Jean Bolland (1596–1665), Belgian Jesuit priest and hagiographer
Kevin Bolland (born 1959), American race car driver
Marc Bolland (born 1959), Dutch businessman, former CEO of Marks & Spencer
Mark William Bolland (born 1966), Deputy Private Secretary to the Prince of Wales 1998–2002
Martin Bolland (born 1956), British businessman
Paul Bolland (born 1979), English professional football player
Phil Bolland (born 1967), English professional football player
Brothers Rob and Ferdi Bolland (born 1955 and 1956), composers and music producers, who recorded as "Bolland" and "Bolland & Bolland"
William Bolland (1772–1840), lawyer and bibliophile
William Procter Bolland (1815–1863), cricketer

See also
Boland (disambiguation)
Bollandist